Nedbank Zimbabwe Limited, also Nedbank Zimbabwe, is a commercial bank in Zimbabwe. It is licensed by the Reserve Bank of Zimbabwe, the central bank and national banking regulator. The bank was previously known as MBCA Bank, prior to rebranding to its present name.

Location
The headquarters of the bank and its min branch are located on the 14th Floor of Old Mutual Centre, at the corner of Third Street and Jason Moyo Avenue, in Harare, the capital and largest city in Zimbabwe. The geographical coordinates of the bank's headquarters are: 17°49'46.0"S, 31°03'12.0"E (Latitude:-17.829444; Longitude:31.053333).

Overview
, the bank is a medium-sized financial services provider in Zimbabwe, with an asset base of nearly ZWL19.956 Billion (historical terms)and ZWL20.007 Billion (Inflation adjusted terms),and shareholders' equity amounting to ZWL1 956 989 405 (historical) and ZWL1 957 136 131 (Inflation-adjusted).

The bank is a subsidiary of the Nedbank Group, an established financial services provider, headquartered in Johannesburg, South Africa, with total assets of almost ZAR1 188 005, as at June 2021.

History
The bank was founded in 1956 by Rhodesia Selection Trust (RST) as the Merchant Bank of Central Africa. Following the issuance of a commercial banking license by the Reserve Bank of Zimbabwe, the national banking regulator, the bank rebranded to MBCA Bank Limited in 2004.
Significant to the development of Southern Rhodesia and to the failing Central African Federation is at much the same time RST's competitor Anglo-American joined with Lazard Brothers of London to found Rhodesian Acceptances Limited (RAL). RAL, now known as RAL Merchant Bank (Zimbabwe) was part of Anglo-America until reorganisation/rationalisation, now in the Nedbank/Old Mutual Group.

Subsidiaries
The bank has 100% ownership in the following subsidiaries:

 Melbek Holdings (Private) Limited - Real estate investments - Zimbabwe
 MBCA Nominees (Private) Limited - Nominee company - Zimbabwe
 MBCA Leasing (Private) Limited - Leasing - Zimbabwe

Ownership
According to the website of the Reserve Bank of Zimbabwe, the major shareholders in the stock of the bank include the following:

Branch network
Nedbank Zimbabwe  maintains a network of branches at the following locations:

 Main Branch: 99 Jason Moyo Avenue, Harare
 Southerton Branch: Shop 3, 11 Highfield Junction Road, Southerton, Harare
 Borrowdale branch, Shop 112, Sam Levy's Village, Borrowdale, Harare
 JMN Branch: Merchant Bank Chambers, 74 Joshua Mqabuko Nkomo Street, Bulawayo
 Belmont Branch, 61 Plumtree Road, Belmont, Bulawayo
 Gweru Branch, 55A Main Street, Gweru
 Mutare Branch: Windsor Msasa House, 75 Herbert Chitepo Street, Mutare
 Victoria Falls Branch: Shop 2, Sawanga Mall, Victoria Falls
 Zvishavane Branch: 100 Ireland Road, Zvishavane.

See also
List of banks in Zimbabwe
Reserve Bank of Zimbabwe
Economy of Zimbabwe

References

External links

Website of Reserve Bank of Zimbabwe

Banks established in 1956
Banks of Zimbabwe
1956 establishments in the Federation of Rhodesia and Nyasaland
Companies based in Harare